Hexachloropropene is a toxic compound of chlorine and carbon. Its linear formula is CCl3CCl=CCl2.

Hexachloropropene can be produced by the elimination reaction of 1,1,1,2,2,3,3-heptachloropropane by potassium hydroxide in methanol solution.

Hexachloropropene can be used to produce other compounds such as uranium tetrachloride, anhydrous niobium pentachloride and tungsten hexachloride.

References

Chloroalkenes